General Stratton may refer to:

James H. Stratton (1898–1984), U.S. Army brigadier general
William Stratton (British Army officer) (1903–1989), British Army lieutenant general

See also
Attorney General Stratton (disambiguation)